Maribel Yerxa Vinson-Owen (née Vinson; October 12, 1911 – February 15, 1961) was an American figure skater and coach. She competed in the disciplines of ladies' singles and pair skating. As a single skater, she was the 1932 Olympic bronze medalist, a two-time World medalist (1928 silver, 1930 bronze), the 1937 North American champion, and a nine-time U.S. national champion. As a pair skater, she was the 1935 North American champion and four-time national champion with George Hill. She also won two national titles with Thornton Coolidge. She was the first female sportswriter at The New York Times, and continued competing and winning medals while working as a full-time reporter.

Vinson-Owen is tied with Michelle Kwan for the record in U.S. ladies' figure skating titles.

Personal life
Maribel Vinson was the daughter of Thomas and Gertrude Vinson of Winchester, Massachusetts. Both of her parents were figure skaters and Maribel was made an honorary member of the Cambridge Skating Club at birth.

A good student, Vinson studied at Radcliffe College, graduating in 1933, all the while pursuing an interest in ice skating. She married Canadian skater Guy Owen and they had two daughters, Maribel Yerxa Owen (1940) and Laurence Rochon Owen (1944). They divorced in 1949, and Guy Owen died three years later at age 38. Following her father's death, also in 1952, she and her daughters moved back east to Winchester and lived with her mother. In February 1961, Maribel Vinson-Owen was killed along with both daughters in the Sabena Flight 548 crash in Belgium.

Competitive career 
Vinson began to take lessons with coach Willie Frick at the Boston Arena at the age of nine. She won the U.S. junior ladies' title at the age of 12.

From 1928 to 1937, Vinson won the women's singles title at the U.S. Championships every year except for 1934. She also teamed up with Thornton L. Coolidge to win the U.S. pairs' title in 1928 and 1929, and with George E. B. Hill to win four titles in 1933, 1935, 1936, and 1937.

At the 1932 Winter Olympic Games in Lake Placid, New York, Vinson earned the bronze medal behind the Norwegian champion Sonja Henie and the Austrian runner up, Fritzi Burger. While still competing, in the 1930s, Vinson became the first woman sportswriter at the New York Times newspaper.

Following her retirement from amateur ice skating, Vinson toured professionally with her husband Guy Owen in shows.

Coaching career
Following the birth of her two daughters, Vinson-Owen began coaching in Berkeley, California. She divorced Owen in 1949 and after her father's death in 1952, she lived in her native Winchester, Massachusetts, and coached at rinks in the Boston area. Her daughters developed a love for ice skating and she trained them in the sport.

Vinson-Owen coached Tenley Albright to five U.S. titles and then to the United States' first Olympic gold medal in ladies' singles. She also taught Frank Carroll, who himself went on to be one of America's top skating instructors, coaching Michelle Kwan to her numerous world and national titles and Evan Lysacek to his Olympic gold medal.

During her lifetime, Vinson-Owen authored several books on her sport:
 Primer of Figure Skating – McGraw-Hill/Whittlesey House (1938)
 Advanced Figure Skating – McGraw-Hill/Whittlesey House (1940)
 The Fun of Figure Skating – Harper & Brothers (1960)

In Primer of Figure Skating, Vinson devotes three-and-a-half pages to what female figure skaters should wear on the ice, which included the correct length and style of skirt, and credits the appeal of the sport to feminine interests in skating fashions. Figure skating historian and writer Ellyn Kestnbaum argues that "Vinson points to several ways in which skating attire connotes (and permits) athleticism and also how it can attract the eye on the merits of its own design elements and by enhancing the visual appeal of the skater's body". Kestnbaum also stated that female skaters should pay more attention to their appearance than men do.

At the 1961 U.S. Championships, her daughter and namesake, Maribel, won the national pair skating title with partner Dudley S. Richards, while her youngest daughter, 16-year-old Laurence, won the ladies' single title. It was the first time CBS broadcast the U.S. national championships on television and the Owen family became instant celebrities.

Plane crash

Vinson-Owen, as a coach, and her two daughters, as competitors, were all part of the United States team scheduled to appear at the 1961 World Championships in Prague, Czechoslovakia. They boarded Sabena Flight 548 at New York City's Idlewild International Airport along with the rest of the American team. The overnight flight had a stopover scheduled for Brussels, Belgium and on its arrival in the clear mid-morning of February 15, the captain had to abort the approach and circle around for a second attempt to land on a different runway. The plane, a Boeing 707, never made it back to the airport; instead, it plunged into the wooded farmland of the village of Berg, Belgium, taking the lives of all 72 passengers and crew plus a farmer at work in his fields. All 18 members of the American figure skating team plus 16 of their relatives, friends, and coaches were among the dead.

The 1961 World Championships were canceled. The remains of Vinson-Owen and her daughters were brought home for interment in the Story Chapel Columbarium at Mount Auburn Cemetery in Cambridge, Massachusetts.

Legacy
Vinson-Owen was inducted into the U.S. Figure Skating Hall of Fame three times – in 1976 as a singles' skater, in 1994 with George E.B. Hill in the pairs' category, and in 2011 as a coach for the 1961 World Team. In 2001, she was inducted to the inaugural class of the Professional Skaters' Association Coaches Hall of Fame, which included the five coaches that perished beside her. In 2002, she was inducted in the World Figure Skating Hall of Fame. Her daughters were inducted into the U.S. Figure Skating Hall of Fame in 2011.

In Winchester, the Vinson-Owen elementary school was named in her and her daughters' honor.

Competitive highlights

Single skating

Pair skating with Hill

Pair skating with Coolidge

See also
 Laurence Owen
 Maribel Owen
 Guy Owen

References

External links
 
  Maribel Vinson Owen at U.S. Figure Skating
 Maribel Vinson Owen – US Figure Skating Legend  at About.com
 

1911 births
1961 deaths
American female single skaters
American female pair skaters
American figure skating coaches
Figure skaters at the 1928 Winter Olympics
Figure skaters at the 1932 Winter Olympics
Figure skaters at the 1936 Winter Olympics
Olympic bronze medalists for the United States in figure skating
Victims of aviation accidents or incidents in Belgium
Radcliffe College alumni
Olympic medalists in figure skating
People from Winchester, Massachusetts
Sportspeople from Middlesex County, Massachusetts
Burials at Mount Auburn Cemetery
World Figure Skating Championships medalists
European Figure Skating Championships medalists
Medalists at the 1932 Winter Olympics
Accidental deaths in Belgium
Female sports coaches
American sportswriters
American women journalists
Women sports journalists
American women sportswriters
Victims of aviation accidents or incidents in 1961
Sportswriters from Massachusetts
20th-century American women